Wedelolactone is an organic chemical compound classified as a coumestan that occurs in Eclipta alba (false daisy) and in Wedelia calendulacea.

References

Catechols
Coumestans
Phenol ethers